Rionegro del Puente is a municipality located in the province of Zamora, Castile and León, Spain. , it had a population of 318 inhabitants.

References

Municipalities of the Province of Zamora